Malabar Gold and Diamonds is a BIS certified Indian jewellery group headquartered in Kozhikode, Kerala, India. It was founded by M. P. Ahammed in the year 1993. The company has more than 260 showrooms across 10 countries at present which makes it one of the largest chains of jewellery stores in the world. The company also owns a network of luxury watch boutiques across India, which operates under the name Malabar Watches.

History
The Malabar Gold Company was established in the year 1993. It has over 307 showrooms across the world currently and the number of outlets. The Malabar Group has been on an expansion since 2000 and more showrooms are expected to be opened in India, Southeast Asia, the Middle East, and in the United States. The brand is mainly committed to India, the Gulf and Far East markets.

In 2005, the company was reported to be a group worth ₹500 crore.

In 2012, the company had a turnover of ₹12,000 crore and by the end of 2013, it posted a turnover of ₹22,000 crore.

In 2017, the Malabar Group had opened 27 outlets across nations.

On 12 January 2018, the company opened 11 outlets in a single day across the globe setting a new record. The number of outlets reached 208 with this launch. Out of the 11 outlets opened, 8 were located in the Gulf region. The new showrooms were established in AL-Hazana Lulu, Al-Khail Mall, Al- Buhaira Lulu, Ajman City Centre and Sahara Centre in the UAE, Lagoona Mall and Mall of Qatar in Qatar, AMK Hub in Singapore, Muscat City Centre in Oman, Warrangal in Telangana, and in Ampang Mall in Malaysia.

It took the company around 25 years to open 215 outlets across 9 countries of the world. Out of all the countries, India is where it has the highest number of outlets and the Indian market accounts for about a third of the company’s revenue. The first brand ambassadors of Malabar Gold were tennis star Sania Mirza and Malayalam actor Mohanlal.

In November 2018, Malabar Gold & Diamonds made its entry into the U.S. market with an outlet in Chicago that was inaugurated by Neeta Bhushan, Counsel General of India. This was the 250th outlet of the group.

Malabar Gold & Diamonds legally converted its UAE operations covering Saudi Arabia, Bahrain and Oman into 100% ownership.

Founder
M. P. Ahammed is the founder of Malabar Gold & Diamonds. He is also the chairman of the company. He was born on 1 November 1957 in Kozhikode, Kerala. He ventured into business at the age of 17 with an agro farming company. In 1981, he started trading spices and copra (dried kernel of coconut). M. P. Ahammed has two children with his wife Subaida K.P. His son Shamlal Ahammed is the company’s Managing Director of International Operations. At the age of 36 in the year 1993, he established Malabar Gold with a capital of ₹50 lakhs in his home town Kozhikode.

Products
Malabar Gold and Diamonds deals in a variety of gold, diamonds, silver, and lifestyle articles. The brand’s exclusive collection of jewelry is named:

Mine: Diamond Jewelry
Era: Uncut Diamond Jewelry
Divine: Indian Heritage Jewelry
Ethnix: Handcrafted Designer Jewelry
Starlet: Kid’s Jewelry
Precia: Precious Gem Jewelry

Malabar Gold and Diamonds specializes in Kashmeera, Meenakari, Kunadan, Turkish, and traditional crafted jewelry.

Stores
Malabar Gold & Diamonds has showrooms located throughout India in all the major states such as Maharashtra, Delhi, Gujarat, Andhra Pradesh, Haryana, Karnataka, Kerala, Tamil Nadu, Telangana, Andhra Pradesh, Odisha, Chhattisgarh, Uttar Pradesh, West Bengal, and Punjab.  Besides India, it also has showrooms in Bahrain, Kuwait, Malaysia, Oman, Qatar, Saudi Arabia, Singapore, and UAE. It entered into the U.S market in 2018.

Brand ambassadors
vishnu kumar
Hema Malini
Dulquer Salmaan (Kerala)
Suriya Sivakumar (Tamil Nadu)
N. T. Rama Rao Jr. (Telangana and Andhra Pradesh)
Puneeth Rajkumar (Karnataka)
Sania Mirza
Tamannaah Bhatia
Kajal Aggarwal
Manushi Chhillar
Ilaiyaraaja
Mohanlal(Kerala)
Anil Kapoor

Notable achievements
Malabar Gold & Diamonds was one of the manufacturing concessionaries of the “Dubai Celebration Chain” that set a new Guinness World Records in 2015. The 5.52 km long chain weighed 240 kilograms and had over 4 million links. It was completely handcrafted. Malabar Gold & Diamonds created 2.5 km of the chain. The Dubai Celebration Chain was presented at the Dubai Shopping Festival 2015.

Malabar Gold & Diamonds opened 11 outlets in 6 countries in a single day. The 11 showrooms were inaugurated on 12 January 2018. The number of Malabar outlets crossed 200 with this launch. Bollywood actor Anil Kapoor participated in the celebrations by inaugurating the outlet at Al Hazana Lulu Dubai. The actor will also be seen in the upcoming series ‘’Malabar Promises’’, produced by Malabar Gold & Diamonds which will be live soon. The new outlets were opened in UAE (Al Khail Mall, Al Buhaira Lulu Mall, Al Hazana Lulu Mall, Ajman City Centre, Sahara Centre), Qatar (Mall of Qatar, Lagoona Mall), Oman (Muscat City Centre), Singapore (AMK Hub), Malaysia (Ampang Mall), and Telangana (Warrangal).

Malabar Gold & Diamonds opened its 14th store in Qatar on Fareej Al Nasr Street.

Social causes and associations
The Malabar group is involved with Green Thumb, a brand that produces organic farming products and Eham Digitals, an electronic And gadgets and home appliances company.

CSR
5% of the profits generated by Malabar Group are devoted to the CSR activities in the fields of health, women empowerment, education, housing, and environment.

Malabar Gold & Diamonds contributed AED 10 million ($2.72 million) to Al Jalila Foundation, a global philanthropic organization dedicated to transforming lives through medical education and research. The contribution was made to support research in diseases and disorders in the United Arab Emirates.

Malabar Gold & Diamonds associated with Al Baraha Hospital on 11 December 2015 to conduct free health check-up and blood donation camps. The camp was also aimed at spreading awareness on the importance of well-balanced diet.

Malabar Gold & Diamonds actively participates in CSR activities in Dubai region. The group particularly engages in activities concerning the differently abled.

Malabar Gold & Diamonds distributed over 1,14,000 special Iftar meals/kits during the auspicious month of Ramadan this year(2019). This was done in association with like-minded organizations from the different countries where the activity was planned.

Malabar Gold & Diamonds sponsored the tickets of 100 prisoners to facilitate their repatriation. The prisoners were those who had completed their jail terms at the Ajman Central Jail.

Malabar Gold & Diamonds organized a blood donation drive on December 26 near one of their outlets in Qatar.

In 2018, the Malabar Group made a contribution of ₹2 crore to Kerala Chief Minister’s distress relief fund to help cope up with the devastating flood in the state. The group also distributed food and water among the victims through its Malabar Gold & Diamonds outlets across the state.

Malabar Group donated one crore to the Telangana Chief Minister Relief Fund to help in the battle against coronavirus pandemic.

Malabar Gold & Diamonds has been actively helping the needy with essential grocery kits across the states of Andhra Pradesh and Telangana.

Malabar Gold & Diamonds distributed over 15,000 food kits comprising essential items such as rice, lentils, oil and spices, to workers in the Gulf and East Asia during the COVID-19 crisis.

Malabar Gold & Diamonds donated ₹1 crore to the PM Care Fund to support the COVID-19 pandemic relief measures.

Awards and recognition
The Malabar group has been awarded with the “Super Brand”award for five consecutive years. Malabar Gold and Diamonds has also received an award by the 'Retail Jewellers India' organization in 2017 for their special contributions to the gemstone and jewellery industry.

In the year 2013, Malabar Gold & Diamonds’ “Brides Of India” campaign won the award for the “Best Advertising Campaign of the year - Audio/Visual.

On 21 February 2014, Malabar Gold & Diamonds was awarded with the Best Retail Chain of the Year award by the All India Gems and Jewelry Trade Federation.

Malabar Gold & Diamonds was honored by the Dubai Municipality for its “Clean up the World 2014” public awareness campaign.

Malabar Gold & Diamonds was honored by the Dubai Police with a special memento for its outstanding CSR activities in the region.

Recently, Malabar Gold & Diamonds was recognized as one of “The Economic Times Best Brands 2019”.

Incidents
On 20 May 2016, the Rolla outlet of Malabar Gold and Diamonds in Sharjah, UAE was robbed. Four thieves broke into the store and made away with 7 kg of gold jewellery kept in display glass counters, around 3:50 AM.
 
The Sharjah Police arrested 3 Pakistani nationals, who were involved in the robbery. One of their accomplice had fled the country a few hours after the incident. The stolen gold was seized from the Jebel Ali Port, from where the gang members planned to send it to Pakistan by cargo.

Expansion plans
Malabar Gold & Diamonds plans to triple its outlets from 250 to 750 by 2023. With this, the company aims to reach a turnover of $6.85 billion. As a part of its FY2023 global expansion plan, Malabar Gold & Diamonds aims to open 21 new stores in the next 6 months. The plan was laid down in October 2018.

Presently operating in 10 countries, Malabar Gold & Diamonds aims to expand its retail network to all Tier-1 and Tier-2 cities in Northern and Central India and to international markets including Sri Lanka, Canada, Bangladesh, Australia, Turkey, and Egypt.

The expansion will also double its employee strength from 13,000 to 25,000.

As on January 22, 2020, Malabar Gold & Diamonds targets to become the world’s largest jewellery chain with revenue of ₹50,000 crores within the next three years. This it aims to achieve by doubling the number of showrooms in India and entering 10 more countries.

References

External links
Malabar Gold and Diamonds
Malabar Platinum
Brides of India: Malabar Gold and Diamonds

Jewellery retailers of India
Retail companies established in 1993
Luxury brands
Indian jewellery designers
Diamond dealers
Companies based in Kerala
Indian brands
1993 establishments in Kerala
Indian companies established in 1993